Sweetbriar (foaled 1769) was a British Thoroughbred racehorse. He won all eight of the races he contested, including a match race against Craven Stakes winner Firetail. He later became a successful stallion, with his progeny including Epsom Derby winner Assassin.

Background
Sweetbriar was a chestnut colt bred by Thomas Meredith and foaled in 1769. He was sired by Great Subscription Purse winner Syphon, who also sired Sweetwilliam. His dam was a daughter of Shakespeare.

Racing career
Sweetbriar made his racecourse debut in October 1773 when he beat the Earl of Ossory's 
Chalkstone, Mr. Vernon's Milliner, Mr. Ogilvy's Consul and Lord Foley's Chesterton in a Sweepstakes of 50 guineas each at Newmarket. Chalkstone had started the 6/4 favourite, with Consul at 5/2 and Sweetbriar at 3/1. At Newmarket's second October meeting he beat Chalkstone again, this time in a match race. At the Houghton meeting he beat Mr. Ogilvy's Porsenna, after starting favourite, as he had done in his match against Chalkstone.

In the spring of 1774 he beat Chalkstone in 1000 guineas race at Newmarket. The bookmakers sent them both of as joint-favourites. He then beat Mr. Foley's Craven Stakes winner Firetail after starting as the 1/3 favourite in another 1000 guineas match race at Newmarket. In October he beat the Duke of Grafton's Lamplighter in a 140 guineas race. Two days later Sweetbriar beat Telemachus and Joquille in a Sweepstakes of 20 guineas each.

In his final start he walked over for the Newmarket Cup in October 1775 and retired unbeaten.

Stud career
Sweetbriar stood as a stallion for Grosvenor and mainly covered his mares. He did meet with some success though, siring 1782 Epsom Derby winner Assassin. He was also the sire of the mares Flyer and Hare. Flyer was the dam of Rhadamanthus and Daedalus, who both won the Derby. Hare foaled Tippitywitchet, who was the dam of the top broodmare the Rubens mare.

See also
List of leading Thoroughbred racehorses

Pedigree

Note: b. = Bay, ch. = Chestnut

* Sweetbriar was inbred 3 ×3 to Little Hartley Mare. This means that the mare appears twice in the third generation of his pedigree. He was also inbred 3 × 4 × 4 to Bartlett's Childers.

References

1769 racehorse births
Racehorses bred in the Kingdom of Great Britain
Racehorses trained in the Kingdom of Great Britain
Thoroughbred family 15
Undefeated racehorses